SAPCA (acronym officially standing for Crowd Control Police Dogs,  and Iran Detectives Police Dogs, ;) is the search and rescue and police dog unit of Law Enforcement Command of Islamic Republic of Iran and a subdivision of its Special Units Command. The unit was established in 2010.

References 

Special forces of Iran
Law Enforcement Command of Islamic Republic of Iran
Police dogs
Detection dogs
People working with dogs